Taligaran (also Romanized as Talīgarān; also known as Talīkarān) is a village in Karipey Rural District, Lalehabad District, Babol County, Mazandaran Province, Iran. At the 2006 census, its population was 955, in 260 families.

References 

Populated places in Babol County